Pempeliella ardosiella is a species of snout moth. It is found in France and Spain.

The wingspan is about 20 mm.

References

Moths described in 1887
Phycitini
Moths of Europe